Petra Vyštejnová (born 12 November 1990) is a Czech football defender, currently playing for Sparta Prague in the Czech Women's First League.

She is a member of the Czech national team. Vyštejnová made her debut for the national team in a match against Italy on 25 October 2008.

References

External links
 
 
 

1990 births
Living people
Czech women's footballers
Czech Republic women's international footballers
Footballers from Prague
Women's association football defenders
AC Sparta Praha (women) players
Czech Women's First League players